Gerald Reive (born 10 March 1937) is a New Zealand-based Falkland Islands lawn bowler.

Bowls career
He represented his country at the 2010 Commonwealth Games in New Delhi, India in Lawn Bowls in the men's pairs event, alongside his playing partner George Paice. They achieved wins against Samoa and Guernsey. Reive was the flag bearer for the Falkland Islands at the closing ceremony. He currently plays lawn bowls at the Papatoetoe Hunters Corner Bowling Club in Auckland He attended his second Commonwealth Games in Glasgow 2014 where he entered the men's fours with Michael Reive, Patrick Morrison, and Barry Ford.

References

1937 births
Living people
Falkland Islands sportspeople
Falkland Islands emigrants to New Zealand
Bowls players at the 2010 Commonwealth Games
People from Stanley, Falkland Islands
British expatriates in New Zealand
Sportspeople from Auckland
Commonwealth Games competitors for the Falkland Islands
Falkland Islands male bowls players